Libelloides is a genus of lacewings  belonging to the owlfly family subfamily Ascalaphinae. The species of this genus are present in most of Europe. They inhabit dry meadows or dry coniferous forests.

Species 
 Libelloides baeticus (Rambur, 1842)
 Libelloides coccajus (Denis & Schiffermüller, 1775)
 Libelloides cunii Selys-Longchamps, 1880
 Libelloides hispanicus (Rambur, 1842)
 Libelloides ictericus (Charpentier, 1825)
 Libelloides lacteus (Brullé, 1832)
 Libelloides longicornis (Linnaeus, 1764)
 Libelloides macaronius (Scopoli, 1763)
 Libelloides rhomboides (Schneider, 1845

References 
 Fischer, K., Hölzel, H., Kral, K. (2006) Divided and undivided compound eyes in Ascalaphidae (Insecta, Neuroptera) and their functional and phylogenetic significance. Journal of Zoological Systematics and Evolutionary Research 44, 285-289.

Kral, K. (2002) Ultraviolet vision in European owlflies (Neuroptera: Ascalaphidae): a critical review. European Journal of Entomology 99: 1-4.

External links 
 Fauna Europaea
 Galerie-insecte
 Biolib

Ascalaphidae
Neuroptera of Europe
Neuroptera genera